is a Japanese former swimmer who competed in the 1988 Summer Olympics.

References

1969 births
Living people
Japanese female backstroke swimmers
Olympic swimmers of Japan
Swimmers at the 1988 Summer Olympics
20th-century Japanese women